The San Antonio Church's Fried Chicken Inc. First International Chess Tournament was a chess competition held in San Antonio, Texas, from November 19 to December 11, 1972. Sponsored by fast food franchise Church's Chicken as a marketing strategy to promote the company and an attempt to capitalize on the rise of the game's popularity in the U.S, the tournament was regarded at the time the strongest chess tournament held in the country since 1924. The list of players invited included famous names like former world champion Tigran Petrosian, regular contenders to the world crown Svetozar Gligoric, Paul Keres and Bent Larsen, and some promising stars, among them Brazilian Henrique da Costa Mecking and future world champion Anatoly Karpov.

List of participants 

Walter Browne
Donald Byrne
Mario Campos-Lopez
Larry Evans
Svetozar Gligoric
Vlastimil Hort
Julio Kaplan
Paul Keres
Anatoly Karpov
Bent Larsen
Henrique Mecking
Tigran Petrosian
Lajos Portisch
Anthony Saidy
Kenneth Smith
Duncan Suttles, whose result at the San Antonio chess tournament granted him his final Grandmaster norm

The tournament 

As a Category XII event (average rating of 2539), the San Antonio Church's Fried Chicken Inc. First International Chess Tournament was strong enough to be regarded at the time the most important chess competition to be held in American soil since New York 1924 (which attracted at the time elite players like Emanuel Lasker, Alexander Alekhine, José Raul Capablanca, Frank Marshall and Richard Réti, among many others). Newly crowned world champion Fischer and deposed champion Spassky were also invited, but declined entry.

The competition was held at the Hilton Palacio del Rio, where all the players also stayed. An open tournament was held alongside the main event, attracting 113 players. British player, arbiter and chess author Harry Golombek was charged with tournament direction.

A three-way tie between Tigran Petrosian, Lajos Portisch and Anatoly Karpov (all 10½ / 15), the tournament result confirmed both the favoritism of ex-world champion Petrosian and the expectations on some of the players from the new generation, specially Karpov, who would become world champion himself only three years later.

Final crosstable

References 

General references

1972 in chess